Arneburg is a town in the district of Stendal, in Saxony-Anhalt, Germany. It is situated on the left bank of the Elbe, approx.  northeast of Stendal. It is part of the Verbandsgemeinde ("collective municipality") of Arneburg-Goldbeck. In July 2009 it absorbed the former municipality Beelitz.

History

The stronghold was founded by Henry the Fowler on the Elbe as a bulwark against the Wends. In the Middle Ages, Arneburg was a strategic possession of Brandenburg, whose Elector Frederick II (the "Iron Elector") mortgaged it for "100 good Rhenish gilders" to Hans von Blumenthal, who was appointed Vogt of Arneburg, a post which he still held long after 1450, when the Hohenzollerns had repaid the mortgage. Arneburg was an important Hohenzollern possession and, indeed, the Elector John Cicero died there in 1499. The ruins are now part of a park surrounded by the town.

References

Towns in Saxony-Anhalt
Stendal (district)